Jonathan Duncan (born 16 May 1982 in Lae, Papua New Guinea) is a swimmer from New Zealand, who competed at the 2000 Summer Olympics in Sydney, in the 200, 400 and 1500m freestyle.

Duncan then went on to complete a bachelor of business degree at Massey University in Auckland in 2004. In 2005, Jonathan started his Master of Entrepreneurship program at the University of Otago and started working for software company Siliconcoach. During this time the Academy Cinema in Dunedin, New Zealand was established with business partner Jeffrey Broughton.

In 2006 Duncan relocated to Edinburgh, Scotland to work as Business Development Manager for Siliconcoach and work on other business initiatives.

External links 
 
 

1982 births
New Zealand male freestyle swimmers
Living people
Massey University alumni
New Zealand businesspeople
Olympic swimmers of New Zealand
Swimmers at the 2000 Summer Olympics
21st-century New Zealand people